Selmenga is a rural locality (a settlement) and the administrative center of Boretskoye Rural Settlement of Vinogradovsky District, Arkhangelsk Oblast, Russia. The population was 994 as of 2010. There are 15 streets.

Geography 
Selmenga is located on the Severnaya Dvina River, 70 km southeast of Bereznik (the district's administrative centre) by road. Yakovlevskaya is the nearest rural locality.

References 

Rural localities in Vinogradovsky District